Seishin may refer to:
Seishin-ni, a Japanese Samurai woman
Chouseishin, a series
Seishin Joshi, a private school
Seishin, Korea, now Chongjin, North Korea
Seishin-Chūō Station, a railway station in Nishi-ku, Kobe, Japan.